The men's road race at the 1949 UCI Road World Championships was the 16th edition of the event. The race took place on Sunday 21 August 1949 in Copenhagen, Denmark. The race was won by Rik Van Steenbergen of Belgium.

Final classification

References

Men's Road Race
UCI Road World Championships – Men's road race